The Rules of the Road is the official road user guide for Ireland.

See also
The Highway Code
Driver's education

External links
Rules of the Road is the official online home of the Irish Rules of the Road

Ireland